Malik Hooker (born April 2, 1996) is an American football safety for the Dallas Cowboys of the National Football League (NFL). He played college football at Ohio State and was drafted by the Indianapolis Colts with the 15th overall pick in the 2017 NFL Draft. While at Ohio State, Hooker was named a unanimous All-American in 2016 and won the 2015 CFP national championship.

Early years
Hooker attended New Castle High School in New Castle, Pennsylvania. He played basketball and two years of football in high school as a cornerback and wide receiver. As a senior, he was the Pittsburgh Post-Gazette Male Athlete of the Year.

College career
After redshirting his first year at Ohio State in 2014, Hooker played in all 13 games in 2015, recording 10 tackles playing mostly special teams. As a redshirt sophomore in 2016, he took over at free safety. During the first game of the season, he recorded his first two career interceptions. On November 29, 2016, Hooker was named first-team All-Big Ten. After the season, Hooker decided to forgo the remaining two years of eligibility and enter the 2017 NFL Draft. After his college career, it was revealed that Hooker underwent surgeries for a torn labrum in his hip and a sports hernia. As a result, Hooker could not participate in the combine.

Professional career

2017 NFL Draft
In February 2017, Hooker went through two surgeries to repair a hernia and a torn labrum. He attended the NFL Scouting Combine, but was unable to participate in any of the drills. 122 NFL scouts and representatives attended Ohio State's Pro Day as well as multiple head coaches, including Bill Belichick (Patriots), Todd Bowles (Jets), Jim Caldwell (Lions), John Harbaugh (Ravens), Hue Jackson (Browns), Marvin Lewis (Bengals), Mike Mularkey (Titans), Sean Payton (Saints), and Mike Tomlin (Steelers). Hooker was projected to be a top 15 pick by NFL draft experts and analysts. He was ranked the top free safety in the draft by DraftScout.com and was ranked the second best safety in the draft, behind Jamal Adams, by Sports Illustrated, ESPN, Pro Football Focus, NFL analyst Mike Mayock, and NFL analyst Bucky Brooks.

Indianapolis Colts

2017 season

The Indianapolis Colts selected Hooker in the first round (15th overall) of the 2017 NFL Draft. He was the second safety selected, behind LSU's Jamal Adams.

On May 18, 2017, the Indianapolis Colts signed Hooker to a fully guaranteed four-year, $12.59 million contract that includes a signing bonus of $2.29 million.

Hooker missed offseason workouts while recovering from surgery and suffered a groin injury during the first day of training camp. A shoulder injury further stunted his process and he was only able to appear in a single preseason game. Head coach Chuck Pagano named Hooker the backup free safety to begin the regular season behind Darius Butler, who began the season alongside strong safety Matthias Farley.

He made his professional regular season debut in the Indianapolis Colts' season-opener at the Los Angeles Rams and recorded four combined tackles in their 46–9 loss. On September 17, 2017, Hooker earned his first career start in place of Darius Butler, who was inactive after sustaining a hamstring injury in the season-opener. Hooker recorded two combined tackles, deflected a pass, and recorded his first career interception off a pass by quarterback Carson Palmer during their 16–13 overtime loss to the Arizona Cardinals in Week 2. The following week, he made three combined tackles, broke up a pass, and intercepted a pass by DeShone Kizer in the Colts' 31–28 victory against the Cleveland Browns. In Week 4, Hooker made three combined tackles, a pass deflection, and had another interception off Russell Wilson in their 46–18 loss at the Seattle Seahawks. It marked his third consecutive game with an interception. On October 8, 2017, Hooker collected a season-high five combined tackles during a 26–23 victory against the San Francisco 49ers. In Week 7, Hooker made two solo tackles before leaving the Colts' 27–0 loss to the Jacksonville Jaguars in the second quarter after suffering a torn ACL and MCL. On October 24, 2017, the Indianapolis Colts placed Hooker on injured reserve after it was discovered he would require surgery and miss the remainder of the season. He finished his rookie season with 22 combined tackles (16 solo), four pass deflections, and three interceptions in seven games and six starts.

2018 season
Hooker made his return from injury in week 1 against the Cincinnati Bengals.  In the game, Hooker made 4 tackles in the 34–23 loss. 
In week 7 against the New York Jets, Hooker made his first interception of the season off rookie quarterback Sam Darnold and returned it for 27 yards in the 42–34 loss. 
In week 16 against the New York Giants, Hooker intercepted Eli Manning in the 28–27 win. 
Hooker finished the season with 41 tackles (28 solo), 3 pass deflections, 2 interceptions, and 1 fumble recovery.

Hooker made his playoff debut in the wildcard round against the Houston Texans.  In the game, Hooker made 2 tackles in the 21–7 win. 
In the divisional round against the Kansas City Chiefs, Hooker was inactive due to a foot injury in the 31–13 loss.

2019 season
In week 1 against the Los Angeles Chargers, Hooker intercepted Philip Rivers in the endzone and returned it 26 yards in the 30–24 overtime loss.

2020 season
On May 1, 2020, the Colts declined the fifth-year option on Hooker's contract, making him a free agent in 2021.

On September 20, 2020, during the Colts' victory over the Minnesota Vikings, Hooker tore his Achilles, ending his 2020 season. He was placed on injured reserve two days later.

Dallas Cowboys
On July 27, 2021, Hooker signed with the Dallas Cowboys. Hooker was able to stay healthy and played in 15 games, recording 44 tackles and one interception.

On March 15, 2022, Hooker signed a two-year contract extension with the Cowboys.

NFL career statistics

References

External links
 
 Ohio State Buckeyes bio

1996 births
Living people
People from New Castle, Pennsylvania
Players of American football from Pennsylvania
American football safeties
Ohio State Buckeyes football players
All-American college football players
Indianapolis Colts players
Dallas Cowboys players